Antelope was a medium clipper built in 1851 in Medford, near Boston, Massachusetts. She sailed in the San Francisco, China, and Far East trades, and was known for her fine finish work and for her crew's escape from pirates. She is often called Antelope of Boston to distinguish her from the extreme clipper Antelope of New York launched in 1852.

Construction
Antelope was designed "to combine large stowage capacity with good sailing qualities." Her frame was white oak, with yellow pine planking and a rock maple keel.

The hull was black, the inside dark buff with blue waterways. Her cabin was "beautifully panelled with satin and zebra woods, set off with rose wood pilasters." The "Boston Daily Atlas" praised Antelope’s ornamental work as "infinitely superior to most of the gaudy stuff now in vogue."

Voyages
Antelope sailed from Boston to San Francisco on her maiden voyage in 149 days, rather than the expected 130 days or less, under the well known Captain Tully Crosby. From there she sailed to Shanghai, returning to New York with a passage of 118 days.

In 1853, Antelope arrived in San Francisco from New York under Captain Snow on August 31 after a passage of 128 days, returning to New York via Callao in 178 days.

After one more round trip to the West Coast of South America Antelope went into the China trade.

Wreck, and piracy
In July 1858, Antelope departed Bangkok for China under Captain Clarke. On August 6, she struck on Discovery Shoal, Paracels Reef, which was not visible due to a high, ending her sailing career after six years and nine months.

Captain Clarke, four passengers, and 13 seamen abandoned ship, and set out in one of the ship's boats. A second boat, which became separated during the night, carried the mate, one seaman, and ten Chinese passengers. Four days later, a Chinese fishing junk came into view. Clarke offered the fishermen $20 for a tow to a place where water could be had. Once the Antelope party was taken in tow, it became evident that the fishermen were not trustworthy. Fearing piracy, the shipwrecked party cut the tow rope and attempted an escape. The fishermen pursued the boat, attacked it with stones, and finally set two fishermen to stand guard with spears while the others robbed the Antelope party. In the midst of the confusion, two of the Antelope sailors took advantage of the distraction and boarded the fishing junk, dispatching its crew. Captain Clarke also attempted to board the junk, but fell in the water and had to be rescued. The shipwrecked Antelope party then took command of the junk, and arrived in Hong Kong on August 14.

References

External links
 Captain Tully Crosby, commander of brig Old Colony, barque Arab, and ships Kingfisher, Monterey, Antelope of Boston, and Charlotte.

California clippers
Individual sailing vessels
Ships built in Medford, Massachusetts
Age of Sail merchant ships of the United States
Piracy in the South China Sea
Shipwrecks in the South China Sea
Maritime incidents in August 1858
1851 ships
Combat incidents